The 2020–21 Grand Prix of Figure Skating Final and ISU Junior Grand Prix Final was scheduled to be held from December 10–13, 2020 at the Capital Indoor Stadium in Beijing, China. The combined event was to be the culmination of two international series — the Grand Prix of Figure Skating and the Junior Grand Prix; however, there was no Junior Grand Prix Final, as the Junior Grand Prix was cancelled. Medals were to be awarded in the disciplines of men's singles, ladies' singles, pair skating, and ice dance on the senior and junior levels. It was originally intended as a test event for the 2022 Winter Olympics.

Due to the COVID-19 pandemic, the event was first postponed and then removed from being hosted in China altogether. The International Skating Union tried searching for a replacement host and alternative dates, before definitively cancelling the event on December 10, 2020.

Impact of the COVID-19 pandemic 
On July 9, the General Administration of Sport of China announced that no international sporting events would be held in China in 2020, except for 2022 Winter Olympics test events. The Chinese Skating Association was scheduled to host several events during the season, including the Grand Prix Final; the Grand Prix Final, to be hosted in Beijing, was the only event exempt from the Chinese government's ruling, due to its status as the test event for the Olympic Games.

On July 20, the ISU officially cancelled the Junior Grand Prix series. On August 4, the ISU confirmed that the Grand Prix series would proceed as scheduled during the fall, but each event would mainly invite skaters located domestically in an effort to limit travel during the global pandemic. At the time, no modified qualification procedure for the Grand Prix Final was announced.

On September 30, the ISU announced the postponement of the Grand Prix Final. It believed that hosting the competitions on the scheduled dates (near year-end holidays and national championships) would have impacted a number of participants, given global travel restrictions and the potential need to quarantine on returning to their home country.

On November 13, a joint adapted sports testing program developed by the Beijing 2022 planning committee, the IOC, the IPC, and various winter sports federations, including the ISU, replaced all scheduled Beijing test events. Despite the ongoing pandemic, the ISU announced that it would evaluate the possibility of finding alternative locations outside China and dates to replace the Grand Prix Final.

On December 10, the ISU announced the definitive cancellation of the Grand Prix Final, alongside that of the 2021 European Championships.

References 

Grand Prix of Figure Skating Final
ISU Junior Grand Prix
Grand Prix of Figure Skating
Grand Prix of Figure Skating
Grand Prix of Figure Skating